The Lake is a three-track EP by Antony and the Johnsons, released in 2004 on Secretly Canadian.

Track listing 
"The Lake" - 5:23 (written by Anohni & Edgar Allan Poe)               
"Fistful of Love" - 5:52 (written by Anohni & Lou Reed)          
"The Horror Has Gone" - 3:38 (written by Anohni)

References

2004 EPs
Antony and the Johnsons albums
Secretly Canadian EPs